The following is a comprehensive list of releases from French electronic music record label Ed Banger Records.

Singles and extended plays

Albums and long plays

Compilations

Soundtracks

Notes

References

External links 
 Ed Banger Records catalogue

Discographies of French record labels